Gopikrishnan is the staff cartoonist of Mathrubhumi daily. Kakadrishty is his popular cartoon column.

Awards

 Media Award for Best Cartoonist for the coverage of the 49th State School Youth Festival 
 Kerala Lalit Kala Academy for Best Cartoonist award for 2017-2018

References

External links
 Gopikrishnan - Kalakeralam directory
Mathrubhumi - Gopikrishnan Cartoons Archive

1971 births
Indian cartoonists
Writers from Thiruvananthapuram
Place of birth missing (living people)
Living people